Hotel Vendome may refer to: 
 Hotel Vendome in Arizona, a historic hotel on the National Register of Historic Places
 Hotel Vendome in Boston, location of the 1972 Hotel Vendome fire
 Hotel Vendome in California (see Timeline of San Jose, California)
 Hôtel de Vendôme in Paris, location of the École nationale supérieure des mines de Paris
 Hôtel de Vendôme (place Vendôme, Paris), a hotel since 1858
 Hotel Vendome (novel), a novel by Danielle Steel